Ibiyinka is a Nigerian unisex given name that may refer to the following notable people:
Ibiyinka Alao (born 1975), Nigerian American artist, architect, writer, film director and musical composer
Ibiyinka A. Fuwape (born 1962), Nigerian academic, professor in physics 
Bode George (Olabode Ibiyinka George), Nigerian politician